Jazzy in the Jungle is a children's picture book by Lucy Cousins, published in 2002. It won the Nestlé Smarties Book Prize Gold Award.

References

2002 children's books
Walker Books books